In Tibetan cuisine, gyabrag is a pancake, made with barley flour, yak butter, dry cheese curds and sugar.

See also
 List of pancakes
 List of Tibetan dishes

References

Pancakes
Tibetan cuisine
Barley-based dishes